Rogier Telderman (born in Utrecht, 1982) is a Dutch jazz pianist, composer and band leader. He is known for his groups the Rogier Telderman Trio and Rogier Telderman's Triptych.

Awards 
In 2016 Telderman was awarded the Young VIP-award by the jazz bookers of the Netherlands, as most talented young jazz artist of the country.

Discography 
As a leader:
 Baldych Courtois Telderman (ACT Music, 2020) - Clouds
 Rogier Telderman Trio (RM Records, 2015) - Contours
As a sideman:
 TEMKO (M-Recordings, 2016) - Darkness Rises 
 Melphi (Snip Records, 2014) - Through The Looking Glass

References 
 Heijden, Rinus van der (2015-04-23). "Een pianist die in zijn eigen landschap wil rondlopen" Jazznu.com. Retrieved 2017-10-02
 Lindsay, Bruce (2015-01-08). "Contours". All About Jazz. Retrieved 2017-10-02

External links 
 Official website

1982 births
Living people
Dutch jazz pianists
Dutch jazz bandleaders
Dutch jazz composers
Musicians from Utrecht (city)
21st-century pianists